The 1848 Revolutions in the Italian states, part of the wider Revolutions of 1848 in Europe, were organized revolts in the states of the Italian peninsula and Sicily, led by intellectuals and agitators who desired a liberal government. As Italian nationalists they sought to eliminate reactionary  Austrian control. During this time, Italy was not a unified country, and was divided into many states, which, in Northern Italy, were ruled by the Austrian Empire. A desire to be independent from foreign rule, and the conservative leadership of the Austrians, led Italian revolutionaries to stage revolution in order to drive out the Austrians. The revolution was led by the state of the Kingdom of Sardinia. Some uprisings in the Kingdom of Lombardy–Venetia, particularly in Milan, forced the Austrian General Radetzky to retreat to the Quadrilatero (Quadrilateral) fortresses.

King Charles Albert, who ruled Piedmont-Sardinia from 1831 to 1849, aspired to unite Italy with the endorsement of Pope Pius IX, head of the Papal States, which comprised then vast territories in the center of the Italian peninsula. He declared war on Austria in March 1848 and launched a full-out attack on the Quadrilateral. Lacking allies, Charles Albert was no match for the Austrian army and was defeated at the Battle of Custoza on 24 July 1848. He signed a truce and withdrew his forces from Lombardy, and thus Austria remained dominant in a divided Italy until the Second Italian War of Independence.

The rebellion 

After witnessing the liberal friendly events that were occurring in Rome, the people of other states started to demand similar treatment.  It commenced on 12 January in Sicily, where the people began to demand a Provisional Government, separate from the government of the mainland. King Ferdinand II tried to resist these changes, however a full-fledged revolt erupted in Sicily, a revolt also erupted in Salerno and Naples. These revolts drove Ferdinand and his men out of Sicily, and forced him to allow a provisional government to be constituted.

Notwithstanding the events in Rome and Naples, the states still were under a conservative rule. Italians in Lombardo-Veneto could not enjoy these freedoms. The Austrian Empire of this region had tightened their grip on the people by further oppressing them with harsher taxes. Tax gatherers were sent out along with the 100,000 man army standing in place, and letting their presence be known. 

These revolts in Sicily helped to spark revolts in the northern Kingdom of Lombardy–Venetia. Revolutions in the Lombardy city of Milan forced about 20,000 of an Austrian General Radetsky's troops to withdraw from the city. Eventually General Radetsky was forced to completely withdraw his troops from the two states, however, due to his expertise, he was able to keep the Quadrilateral fortresses of Verona, Peschiera, Legnano and Mantua. Through his skillful tactics he brought his men that had been withdrawn into the key forts. Meanwhile, the Italian insurgents were encouraged when news of Prince Metternich abdicating in Vienna spread out, but were unable to completely eradicate Radetsky's troops. Also, by this time Charles Albert of Piedmont had published a liberal constitution for Piedmont.

In the Quadrilateral General Radetsky and his men were plotting a counterattack in order to regain their lost ground. However, they were interrupted by Charles Albert of Sardinia, the King of Sardinia, who had by then taken the forefront of the attack, and had launched an attack against the Quadrilateral. Charles charged the fortress from all sides aided by 25,000 reinforcements, who came in assistance of their fellow citizens. While journeying to the fortress preparing for the attack, Charles garnered the support of princes of other states. His fellow princes responded by sending reinforcements to his aid: Leopold II, Grand Duke of Tuscany sent 8,000, Pope Pius contributed 10,000, and Ferdinand II sent 16,050 men on the advice of general Guglielmo Pepe. They attacked the fortresses and on 3 May 1848 succeeded in winning the battle of Goito and capturing the fortress of Peschiera.

At that point, Pope Pius IX became nervous about defeating the Austrian empire  and withdrew his troops, citing that he could not endorse a war between two Catholic nations. King Ferdinand of the Kingdom of the Two Sicilies also called his soldiers back and retired his troops. However, some of them did not comply with the order and continued on under the guidance of Generals Pepe, Durando and Giovanni. A year later, Charles launched another attack, but, due to the lack of troops, he was defeated in the Battle of Novara.

Aftermath 
 
Despite the fact that Pius had abandoned the war against the Austrians, many of his people had still fought alongside Charles Albert. The people of Rome rebelled against Pius' government and assassinated Pellegrino Rossi, Pius' minister. Pope Pius IX then fled to the fortress of Gaeta, under the protection of King Ferdinand II. In February 1849, he was joined by Leopold II, Grand Duke of Tuscany who had to flee from there because of another insurrection. Piedmont was also lost to the Austrians in 1849 and Charles Albert had to abdicate leaving his son, Victor Emanuel II, to rule.

In Rome, the authority that did take over passed popular legislation to eliminate burdensome taxes and give work to the unemployed. Giuseppe Garibaldi and Giuseppe Mazzini came to build a "Rome of the People," and the short-lived Roman Republic was proclaimed. The Republic succeeded in inspiring the people to build an independent Italian nation. It also attempted to improve economically the lives of the underserved by giving some of the Church's large landholdings to poor peasants. It also made prison and insane asylum reforms, gave freedom to the press, provided secular education, but shied away from the "Right to Work", having seen this fail in France.

However, the many reforms instituted by the new Republic combined with its lowering of taxes brought about monetary problems which the Republic then compounded by simply printing more money. Runaway price inflation doomed the economy of the Republic. In addition sending troops to defend the Piedmont from Austrian forces put Rome at risk of attack from Austria. However, Pope Pius appealed to Napoleon III for help. The French President saw this as an opportunity to gain Catholic support. The French army arrived by sea under the command of general Charles Oudinot, and, despite an early loss to Garibaldi, the French, with the help of the Austrians, eventually defeated the Roman Republic. On July 12, 1849 Pope Pius IX was escorted back into town and ruled under French protection until 1870.

See also 
 Revolutions of 1848
 Revolt of Genoa
 Unification of Italy
 Bourgeois revolution

References

Further reading
 De Mattei, Roberto. Pius IX  (2004)
 Ginsborg, Paul. "Peasants and Revolutionaries in Venice and the Veneto, 1848," Historical Journal, Sep 1974, Vol. 17 Issue 3, pp 503–550 in JSTOR
 Ginsborg, Paul. Daniele Manin and the Venetian Revolution of 1848-49 (1979)
 Rapport, Michael. 1848: Year of Revolution (2010) pp 79–93
 Robertson, Priscilla. Revolutions of 1848: A Social History (1952) pp 311–401 
 Smith, Denis Mack. Mazzini (1996)  excerpt and text search

External links 
 "Encyclopedia of 1848 Revolutions" new articles by scholars; comprehensive coverage
Revolutions of 1848